The Perserschutt, a German term meaning "Persian debris" or "Persian rubble", refers to the bulk of architectural and votive sculptures that were damaged by the invading Persian army of Xerxes I on the Acropolis of Athens in 480 BC, in the Destruction of Athens during the Second Persian invasion of Greece.

History

The Athenians had fled the city, returning only upon the departure of the Persians. The city had been sacked and burned and most of the temples had been looted, vandalized, or razed to the ground. The desecrated items were buried ceremoniously by the Athenians.  Later, the citizens of Athens cleared the top of their acropolis, rebuilt their temples, and created new works of sculpture to be dedicated for the new temples.

The remains were preserved by the respectful action and sculptures from the burial were first excavated in 1863–66 by the French archaeologist Charles Ernest Beulé.  The remainder was discovered in 1885–1890 by archaeologist Panagiotis Kavvadias and architects Wilhelm Dörpfeld and Georg Kawerau.  They include such celebrated sculptures as the Kritios Boy, the Calf Bearer, and the Angelitos Athena.

Details of the excavations were published in 1906 (see references: Kavvadias, P., Kawerau, G.).

Remains from the Perserschutt

See also

 Archaic Acropolis
 Korai of the Acropolis of Athens

References 
 Panagiotis Kavvadias, Georg Kawerau: Die Ausgrabung der Akropolis vom Jahre 1885 bis zum Jahre 1890, Athens, 1906
 Jens Andreas Bundgaard: The Excavation of the Athenian Acropolis 1882—1990. The Original Drawings edited from the papers of Georg Kawerau, Copenhagen, 1974
 Astrid Lindenlauf: Der Perserschutt auf der Athener Akropolis (Wolfram Hoepfner: Kult und Kultbauten auf der Akropolis, International Symposium, 7-9 July 1995, Berlin) Berlin, 1997, pp. 45–115
 Martin Steskal: Der Zerstörungsbefund 480/79 der Athener Akropolis. Eine Fallstudie zum etablierten Chronologiegerüst, Antiquitates – Archäologische Forschungsergebnisse, Bd. 30. Verlag Dr. Kovač, Hamburg, 2004, 

5th-century BC Greek sculptures
1863 archaeological discoveries
1880s archaeological discoveries
1890s archaeological discoveries
Acropolis of Athens
Archaeological discoveries in Greece
Greco-Persian Wars
Archaic Greek art